Astictoneura is a genus of gall midges in the family Cecidomyiidae. There are at least two described species in Astictoneura.

Species
These two species belong to the genus Astictoneura:
 Astictoneura agrostis (Osten Sacken, 1862)
 Astictoneura muhlenbergiae (Marten, 1893)

References

Further reading

 
 
 
 
 

Cecidomyiinae
Articles created by Qbugbot
Cecidomyiidae genera